Introduction to Statistical Pattern Recognition is a book by Keinosuke Fukunaga, providing an introduction to statistical pattern recognition. The book was first published in 1972 by Academic Press, with a 2nd edition being published in 1990.

Synopsis 
 Chapter 1: Introduction
 Chapter 2: Random Vectors and Their Properties
 Chapter 3: Hypothesis Testing
 Chapter 4: Parametric Classifiers
 Chapter 5: Parameter Estimation
 Chapter 6: Nonparametric Density Estimation
 Chapter 7: Nonparametric Classification and Error Estimation
 Chapter 8: Successive Parameter Estimation
 Chapter 9: Feature Extraction and Linear Mapping for Signal Representation
 Chapter 10: Feature Extraction and Linear Mapping for Classification
 Chapter 11: Clustering

Reception 
The book has received reviews from publications including Thomas M. Cover in the journal IEEE Transactions on Information Theory, Anthony J. Duben in the journal ACM Computing Reviews, and John Clements Davis in the journal Computers & Geosciences.

Editions 
 Introduction to Statistical Pattern Recognition (Academic Press, 1972)
 Introduction to Statistical Pattern Recognition - 2nd Edition (Academic Press, 1990)
 Introduction to Statistical Pattern Recognition - 2nd Edition (Academic Press, 2013)

References 

1972 non-fiction books
Pattern recognition